Pterolophia japonica is a species of beetle in the family Cerambycidae. It was described by Stephan von Breuning in 1939.

References

japonica
Beetles described in 1939